Hans Christoffer Wenningsted Tórgarð (born 1969), better known as Hans Tórgarð, is a Faroese actor, director and dramatist. In the Faroe Islands he is mainly known for acting on stage and for his work as a voice actor in Faroese radio plays and children's TV-series translated into Faroese. In 2015 and 2016 he plays the role as Dvalinn in the Icelandic TV-series Trapped.

Background 
Tórgarð grew up in Kvívík, Faroe Islands. His father was Axel Tórgarð, a priest and translator, he translated among other works the Lord of the Rings trilogy and the Hobbit into Faroese. Tórgarð's sisters Ria and Súsanna are well known actors in their native Faroe Islands. His grandfather was the Faroese architect H. C .W. Tórgarð.

The Tórgarð children were all very interested in acting and theater. Once the children hosted a birthday party and set up the play Hansel and Gretel all by themselves. In a 1998 interview the siblings looked back on their childhood and talked about how they began acting as children. "Mother was the one that taught acting to us and the other children in the village. She obtained the plays and served as a whisperer at performances".

Tórgarð obtained Master of Arts in theater at Teaterhögskolan in Helsinki, Finland in 1999. He has played in numerous roles on stage at the Faroese National Theater since 1991. He has also voiced several characters for Faroese children's television.

Career

Stage actor 
Meðan vit bíða eftir Godot (Samuel Beckett) 2011
Kirsiberjagarðurin (Anton P. Tjekhov) 2010
Vatnið vinnur harðar hellur 2010
The Danny Crowe Show (David Farr) 2010
Aftaná Undrið (Jóanes Nielsen) 2009
Í Geyma (Dánjal Hoydal) 2008
Cafe Grugg, Tjóðpallurin 2008
Eg eri mín egna kona (Doug Wright) - Tjóðpallurin 2007
Náttarherbergið (Maxim Gorky) - Tjóðpallurin 2007
Í Óðamansgarði (William Heinesen/Dánjal Hoydal, Sunleif Rasmussen) - Tjóðpallurin 2006
Peer Gynt (Henrik Ibsen) Gríma 2003
List (Yasmina Reza) Gríma 2002
MacBeth (William Shakespeare) Gríma, Teater Västernorrland, Turnékompaniet 2002
Eitur nakað land week-end? (Jóanes Nielsen) Gríma 2001
Serlingar (Regin Patursson) SvF 2000
Glæma og Máttur (Sigga Vang) Svan Film 2000 
Móðir Sjeystjørna (William Heinesen/Egi Dam) Gríma 2000
Oliver Twist (Charles Dickens/Hans Rosenquist) Gríma 1997
Góða Jelena (Ljudmila Razumovskaya) Gríma 1994
Royndin – variatiónir yvir Nólsoyar Páll (Egi Dam) Gríma 1993
Glataðu Spælimenninir (William Heinesen/Jørgen Ljungdahl) Leikarafelag Føroya and The Nordic House 1993
Sjeynda Boð – stjal eitt sindur minni (Dario Fo) Leikarafelag Føroya 1991

Actor and/or translator 
Piaf (Pam Gems) Havnar Sjónleikarfelag 2006 (translation)
Elling og Kjell Bjarni (Ingvar Ambjørnsen) Gríma 2004  (translator and actor)
Góðir dagar (Samuel Beckett) Gríma 2002  (translation)
Krypilin úr Inishmaan (Martin McDonagh) Gríma 2000  (translator and actor)
Óndskapurin (Jan Guillou/Benny Haag) Gríma 1999  (translator and actor)
Liva tikarar í Congo (Bengt Ahlfors, Johan Bargum) Gríma 1992 (translator and actor)

Playwright/dramatizing 
Momo, Tjóðpallur Føroya, 2005 (dramatizing by Michael Ende. Hans Tórgarð wrote playwright together with Ria Tórgarð, Hans Tórgarð was also actor)
Søgur úr Krabburð (dramatizing by J.P.Heinesen together with Bárður Persson) Gríma 2003, also actor
Risans Hjarta, Gríma 2002 (manuscript together with Gunnvá Zachariassen) also actor
My Little Darling, Teater Viirus 1999 (Playwright together with Jonte Ramsten and Anders Öhrström) - also actor
Lívstrá, Gríma 1998 (manuscript from the letters of V. van Goghs.) Also actor 
Eldførið, Norðurlandahúsið 1996 (dramatizing by H.C.Andersen.) Hans Tórgarð was also actor
Vættrarnir av Galdralondum, Sjónvarp Føroya 1992 (Playwright together with Katarina Nolsøe) - also actor

Theatre director, playwright and scenography 
Seinasta bandið hjá Krapp (Samuel Beckett) 2013 (director)
Kvinnan í svørtum (Stephen Mallatratt), 2008 (director)
Othello (William Shakespeare) Huðrar 2008 (director)
Eg eri mín egna kona (Doug Wright) Tjóðpallur Føroya 2008 (translator, director, scenography, actor) 
Náttin áðrenn Skógin, (Bernard-Marie Koltés) Tjóðpallur Føroya 2007 (director)
Harpuríma, Havnar Sjónleikarfelag 2006 (playwright and director)
Søgan um ein soldát (I. Stravinsky, F.Ramuz) Aldubáran and Tjóðpallur Føroya 2006 (director)
Fótur í Hosu, Gríma 2001 (playwright together with Súsonna Tórgarð, scenography og director)
Rumbul í Húsi, Gríma 1998 (playwright together with Súsonna Tórgarð og Katarina Nolsøe, og director)
Harpuríma, Leikbólkurin 1995 (playwright and director)
Fýra Ung (playwright together with Óli Olsen, and director) Primus Productions 1994

Filmography 
 Trapped (TV-series) (2015-2016) as Dvalinn the engineer
 A Faraway Land (Feature film) (2021) as Sigmund Garðalíð
 Trom (TV-series) (2022) as Haraldur Martinsson

References

External links 
 Hans Tórgarð at the Internet Movie Database

Living people
1969 births
Faroese male actors
Faroese voice actors
Danish male dramatists and playwrights
Faroese theatre directors
Danish male voice actors
20th-century Danish dramatists and playwrights
21st-century Danish dramatists and playwrights